WDWL (channel 36) is a TBN Enlace-affiliated television station licensed to Bayamón, Puerto Rico. Founded May 11, 1987, the station is owned by TeleAdoración Christian Network. WDWL shares transmitter facilities with WUJA (channel 58) at Cerro La Marquesa in Aguas Buenas. The station has its main studios located at Sabana Seca in Toa Baja.

Digital television 
WDWL's digital signal is multiplexed:

Analog-to-digital conversion

On June 12, 2009, WDWL signed off its analog signal and completed its move to digital.

Spectrum reallocation 
On August 18, 2017, it was revealed that WDWL's over-the-air spectrum had been sold in the FCC's spectrum reallocation auction, fetching $7,780,8506. WDWL will not sign off, but it will later share broadcast spectrum with WUJA, another religious television station that covers the entire metropolitan area.

References

External links 
Official site

Television channels and stations established in 1991
1991 establishments in Puerto Rico
Religious television stations in the United States
Bayamón, Puerto Rico
Christian television stations in Puerto Rico
Trinity Broadcasting Network affiliates